Great Britain women's national hockey team may refer to:

 Great Britain women's national field hockey team
 Great Britain women's national ice hockey team